Khok Ta Hom Railway Halt is a railway halt located in Ang Thong Subdistrict, Thap Sakae District, Prachuap Khiri Khan.

Khok Ta Hom is being upgraded to a staffed station, which will begin operation when the double tracking of the line section is completed.

Train services 
 Ordinary 254/255 Lang Suan-Thon Buri-Lang Suan

References 
 
 

Railway stations in Thailand